Indian Institute of Technology Bhilai (IIT Bhilai) is a public technical and research university located in Bhilai, Chhattisgarh, India. It is one of the six young IITs established by the Ministry of Human Resource Development, Government of India, located in Chhattisgarh state. Classified as an Institute of National Importance, IITBH formally came into existence in July 2016 with the influx of the first batch of students on 25 July 2016.

Until the infrastructure and permanent campus is ready, the institute will function temporarily at the campus of the Government Engineering College Raipur. This temporary campus of IIT Bhilai is located in Sejbahar area on Old Dhamtari Road in Raipur. Four storied Block-B of the GEC building has been fully renovated and furnished for IIT Bhilai.

The Chhattisgarh Government has allotted 445 acres of land around Kutelabhata and Sirsa Khurd villages of Durg district for the new IIT campus.

Campus

Transit campus 
Presently, IIT Bhilai is functioning from its transit campus at Government Engineering College (GEC) Raipur. The transit campus of IIT Bhilai situated on Old Dhamtari Road in Raipur has been successfully operational since 2016. Four storied Block-B of GEC Raipur building has been furnished for academic activities at IIT Bhilai. Apart from this, IIT Bhilai has its own hostels for boys and girls provided by GEC Raipur in the campus.

Permanent campus 
The permanent campus is expected to come up in Bhilai, Durg district of Chhattisgarh. IIT Bhilai will be situated in the village of Kutelabatta and Sirsa Khurd, Bhilai in approximately 447 acres of land near the Shivnath river, adjoining the steel city of Bhilai. The proposed campus is expected to be equipped with infrastructure to accommodate 2500 students in the first phase.

The permanent campus has  received the GRIHA  award for architectural design and energy management.

Organization and administration 

The academic departments in IIT Bhilai include:
Electrical Engineering and Computer Science (includes CSE, EE & DSAI)
Mechanical Engineering
Physics
Chemistry
Mathematics
Liberal Arts

Academics 

IIT Bhilai offers regular and research-based program in various fields of science, engineering and humanities department. It offers four-years BTech and two-years MTech degrees in four disciplines of engineering, two-year MSc degree in science and a PhD degree across all disciplines of engineering, sciences and liberal arts.

IIT Bhilai uses a Fractal Academic System which involves continuous evaluation of students, and more choices on subject they want to pursue outside their core area. The fractal academics offers scope of various modern mechanisms of imparting education including Tele-education, creation of breadth as well as depth of the subjects, offers flexibility, fosters modern interdisciplinary education, offers wider choice of electives, encourages research at the undergraduate level, provides scope for strong industry interaction, encourages creativity and offers a bouquet of courses in Creative Arts (music, movie making, fine arts, photo journalism, performing arts, etc.)

Facilities 
The transit campus has facilities and amenities for sustaining the research needs of the academia as well as nurturing the extra-curricular activities undertaken by the students.

The institute has two high-speed Internet links provided by National Knowledge Network and BSNL respectively. IIT Bhilai is a part of National Knowledge Network (NKN) under which all the national level institutes are connected via the high-speed fiber network. The hostels are connected through campus-wide LAN and provide Wi-Fi links to students to use. Entire campus of IIT Bhilai is Wi-Fi enabled and students can use the network seamlessly across various facilities.

The academic building houses the central library, various laboratories and workshops which are equipped with state-of-the-art apparatus.

Laboratories 
There are four laboratories – Computer Centre, Electrical Lab, Physics lab and a Chemistry lab.

The institute has two computer laboratories. The labs have a total of 64 Dell OptiPlex 9020 MT Desktops with 4 GB RAM and 500 GB hard disks, and six Dell PowerEdge R 630 servers.

IIT Bhilai has its computer center ITIS that stands for – Information Technologies Infrastructure and Services to support the academics affairs and administration at the institute. It is known as the "NUCLEUS" of IIT Bhilai. ITIS provides gigabit network connectivity to the entire campus. ITIS ensures seamless functioning of all the IT related functions like Network Connectivity and Internet, computer labs, LDAP, conferencing, email services, Technical support, Smart ID Card bio-metric services, and VoIP.

Chemistry lab apparatus includes a vortex mixer, rotary evaporator, UV ozone cleaner and so on. The lab also supports fume extractors which restore the air purity and hence limit the exposure to hazardous or toxic fumes, vapors or dust.

Workshops 

Workshops have been set up in the main building which support prototyping and building of various projects undertaken by both undergraduate as well as post-graduate students. The workshops play an integral role in the curriculum by providing hands-on training to the students. These workshops have served as incubation centers for the first automobile car developed by the students of the mechanical engineering department.

 Digital Fabrication Lab: Equipped with 3D printers and 3D scanners, the Digital fabrication lab caters to the needs of rapid prototyping of plastic parts for various projects. The students learn the basics of designing in the freshman year by courtesy of a course on 3D printing which introduces CAD modelling and gradually builds up to having the students make their own 3D printed projects.
 Do It Yourself (DIY) Lab: The lab provides hands on training of various manufacturing processes. Prioritizing the safety of the students, the training is carried out using table-top machinery and cold-casting in lieu of the traditional methods. The students are introduced to various machinery including Laser cutters, CNCs and Lathes.

Partnerships and collaborations 
 Bhilai Steel Plant (BSP) has signed a MoU with 'IIT Bhilai' for Industry Academic Collaboration. As part of the MoU that IIT Bhilai signed with Bhilai Steel Plant, IIT Bhilai will provide its services through its faculty and staff members in the areas of joint research & development activities, including those related to innovation & creativity, joint exploration in areas of steel-making, manufacturing, fabrication processes, information technology, etc. to troubleshoot technical problems in various production processes of Bhilai Steel Plant. BSP shall provide internship and project-work opportunities to B Tech and M Tech students and research scholars from IIT Bhilai.
MoU signed between IIT Bhilai and Chhattisgarh Biofuel Development Authority (CBDA) for Academic and Research Cooperation in Biofuels & Bioenergy, on 20 May 2019 
MoU signed between IIT Bhilai and CDAC Pune to collaborate on technological development and deployment in the areas of mutual interest, on 14 April 2019 
MoU signed between IIT Bhilai and 36Inc - Startup Chhattisgarh for Academic and Research Cooperation on 5 January 2019 
In 2018 the institute's Innovation Council (IIC) was established under the MHRD's Innovation Cell (MIC) scheme. The IIC of IIT Bhilai was recognized by MIC on 21 November 2018
MoU signed between IIT Bhilai and Vara Technologies for imparting skills on Cyber Security and Internet of Things (IoT), on 11 October 2018 
MoU signed between IIT Bhilai and Infineon Technologies for joint promotion of Infineon's security solutions, on 27 September 2018 
MoU signed between IIT Bhilai and Centre for Materials for Electronics Technology (C-MET) for Academic and Research Cooperation on 23 July 2018 
MoU signed between IIT Bhilai and CSIR-National Chemical Laboratory, Pune, India for Academic and Research Cooperation on 7 June 2018 
 MoU was signed between IIT Bhilai and National Chin-Yi University of Technology, Taiwan to partner student/faculty exchange and to foster R&D projects on 2 May 2018 
 IIT Bhilai had signed an MoU with Central Public Works Department, Government of India for construction of various components of building and allied service in the permanent campus on 14 March 2018
MoU signed between IIT Bhilai and IIT Kanpur for sharing of Web-based software on 21 April 2017

Student life 

Apart from the academics, the student life at IIT Bhilai various includes extra-curricular activities which are held by various student clubs. From hackathons to cultural events, all are managed by student bodies. In support of various social causes, the students also volunteer for different activities under the National Service Scheme. Regular drives of Swachh Bharat Mission are carried out within the campus as well as around it. The students are also involved in teaching drives which cover the neighboring schools in the villages.

Council of Student Affairs (CoSA)  
The Council of Student Affairs (CoSA) was established in 2018. The CoSA is an extension of the student gymkhana system - which was in place during the academic year 2017–18. The CoSA is a canopy for two parallel bodies – The Student Gymkhana (responsible for managing cultural, technical, sports and outreach activities) and the Students’ Senate (manages academic concerns). The bodies consist of elected student representatives from both UG and PG levels and are guided by the faculty members. The President heads the CoSA. The Student Gymkhana and the Students’ Senate further consists of elected students representing various spheres of concern such as cultural (music, dance, art, drama), sports, academics and so on. In 2018, the elections to the above posts were carried out using Electronic Voting Machines (EVMs) and a cent percent voting attendance was recorded.

MERAZ (Techno-Cultural Fest)  
Within a couple of years since its inception, IIT Bhilai conducted its first major annual technical and cultural festival – Meraz. The fest was held in October 2018 over a span of 3 days and featured events and performances by various professionals from both – the Technical and as well as the Entertainment industry. With an attendance of over a thousand students from all across the state, Meraz brought in a huge influx of technical as well as cultural diversity.

IIT Bhilai Motorsports 
IIT Bhilai Motorsports is a student team as a part of Motorsports Club from Indian Institute of Technology Bhilai. The Club being established in 2017, consists of 60+ members targeting to design and fabricate ATV to compete in national level all terrain vehicle events.

IIT Bhilai Motorsports made its debut at Enduro Student India (ESI) 2019, being the only 3rd gen IIT to participate in this competition. The team successfully cleared technical inspections based on design, engine check and brake check test in static events. In dynamics, the team actively participated in all the events - DirtX, Sprint, Acceleration & Maneuverability as well as Endurance race.

A team of 17 members represented IIT Bhilai Motorsports at Pune in the competition along with more than 70 other teams.

Sports activities 
Apart from the technical laboratories, the transit campus also offers the students an opportunity to practice various sports. Floodlight enabled football ground, volleyball court, basketball court and indoor badminton courts serve as the focal point of sports development in IIT Bhilai.

Prayatna is a multi-sport, intra-institute event held annually during the winter semester. It was started in 2018 with the motive of encouraging sports as an integral part of one's holistic development. Prayatna spans over two and a half months featuring 5 to 6 teams competing in various indoor and outdoor games.  
Inter-IIT Sports Meet: IIT Bhilai has been an active participant in the prestigious Inter-IIT games, sending its contingent from the first year itself to the Inter-IIT Sports Meet 2016. In 2017 the institute grabbed its first major trophy by winning the Inter-IIT Impact League.

Covid-19 innovations 

 Chemistry Department has developed hand sanitizers, to use across the campus.
 Mechanical Engineering Department  has developed novel technologies to help medical doctors and health care personnel like a full face mask, which is not only to protect the mouth and the nose, but also covers the eyes and ears. Reusability is the biggest advantage of the mask and it can be prepared for reuse within 30 minutes. Two N95 compatible filters are attached to this mask for sufficient air circulation. There is an additional feature for attaching hazmat clothing to the mask, which enhances its protection levels while putting on and removing the mask.
 A first generation nasal test swab has been fabricated in-house using biocompatible material. A nanoparticle-based anti-viral/anti-microbial coating on clothing has been developed. 
 The institute has worked on building a PAN IIT alumni network for defining COVID-19 test plans. 
 A contactless water dispenser has been designed by the Electrical Engineering Lab. It is an IR sensor based device, designed for indoor applications like a water dispenser for washing hands or drinking water kiosk.
During these testing times IIT Bhilai has come forward and is providing its ambulance services in collaboration with Sumit Foundation, Raipur for needy patients.

See also
 Education in India
Indian Institutes of Technology (IITs)
 List of universities in India
 University Grants Commission (India)

References

External links
 

Bhilai
Engineering colleges in Chhattisgarh
Education in Bhilai
Educational institutions established in 2016
2016 establishments in Chhattisgarh